The Italian occupation of Majorca lasted throughout the Spanish Civil War. Italy intervened in the war with the intention of annexing the Balearic Islands and Ceuta and creating a client state in Spain. The Italians sought to control the Balearic Islands because of their strategic position, from which they could disrupt lines of communication between France and its North African colonies, and between British Gibraltar and Malta. Italian flags were flown over the island. Italian forces dominated Majorca, with Italians openly manning the airfields at Alcúdia and Palma, as well as Italian warships being based in the harbour of Palma.

Prior to all-out intervention by Italy, Benito Mussolini authorized "volunteers" to go to Spain, resulting in the seizure of the largest Balearic island of Majorca by a force under Fascist Blackshirt leader Arconovaldo Bonaccorsi (also known as "Count Rossi"). Sent to Majorca to act as Italian proconsul in the Balearics, Bonaccorsi proclaimed that Italy would occupy the island in perpetuity and initiated a brutal reign of terror, arranging the murder of 3,000 people accused of being communists, and emptying Majorca's prisons by having all prisoners shot. In the aftermath of the Battle of Majorca, Bonaccorsi renamed the main street of Palma de Majorca Via Roma, and adorned it with statues of Roman eagles. Bonaccorsi was later rewarded by Italy for his activity in Majorca.

Italian forces launched air raids from Majorca against Republican-held cities on mainland Spain. Initially Mussolini only authorized a weak force of Italian bomber aircraft to be based in Majorca in 1936 to avoid antagonizing Britain and France. However the lack of resolve by the British and French to Italy's strategy in  the region, encouraged Mussolini to deploy twelve more bombers to be stationed in Majorca, including one aircraft flown by his son, Bruno Mussolini. By January 1938, Mussolini had doubled the number of bombers stationed in the Balearics and increased bomber attacks on shipping headed to support Spanish Republican forces.  The buildup of Italian bomber aircraft on the island's airfields and increased Italian air attacks on Republican-held ports and shipping headed to Republican ports was viewed by France as provocative. 

According to historian Manuel Aguilera, in 1937 the desperate Republican government contacted Italian diplomats through José Chapiro to negotiate Italian neutrality.
The Italian conditions were:
 Spanish Morocco
 100 million dollars to cover Italian expenses in the war
 The colonization of the Balearic Islands with 100 000 Italians and a similar quantity in Peninsular Spain plus one or two air bases. 
This last condition was the most admissible for Luis Araquistáin, the Republic ambassador to France.
In 1950, former minister Federica Montseny remembered that the government evaluated offering the Balearic or the Canary Islands to Nazi Germany.

In 1938, the Italian Ministry of Finances bought a big estate in the S'Albufera area of Majorca through a proxy society, .

After Franco's victory in the civil war, and several days after Italy's conquest in the Balkans of Albania, Mussolini issued an order on April 11 or 12 1939, to withdraw all Italian forces from Spain. Mussolini issued this order in response to Germany's sudden action of invading Czechoslovakia in 1939, in which Mussolini was aggravated by Hitler's swift success and sought to prepare Italy to make similar conquests in Eastern Europe.

See also
 Spanish Civil War

References

Kingdom of Italy (1861–1946)
History of the Balearic Islands
1936 establishments in Spain
Majorca
Spanish Civil War
Italy–Spain relations